Dil Kaa Heera is a 1979 Bollywood film directed by Dulal Guha. The film stars Dharmendra and Hema Malini .

Cast
Dharmendra ...Customs Officer Rajat Sharma 
Hema Malini ...Roopa 'Parirani' 
Sachin ...Kundan Sharma 
Abhi Bhattachary ...Gupta 
Prakash Gill   
Nandita Bose ...Seema Gupta 
Master Sandeep ...Munna (as Master Sundeep) 
Agha ...Manoharlal K. Shah 
Pinchoo Kapoor ...Dinesh Patel 
Brahmachari ...Jai (as Bramchaari) 
Satyendra Kapoor ...Satyam Malhotra (as Satyen Kapoo) 
Jagdish Raj ...Pilot 
Jatin Khanna   
Sanjana   
Ratna

Songs
Lyrics: Anand Bakshi

"Ek Patthar Dil Ko Main Dil De Baithi" - Mohammed Rafi, Lata Mangeshkar
"Hanste Hanste Log Lagte Hain Rone" - Asha Bhosle
"Hanste Hanste Tu Kyon Lag Gaya Rone" - Asha Bhosle
"Mere Sainyaan Ne Bulaaya Singaapur Se" - Lata Mangeshkar
"Zindagi Ka Yoon Jubaan Par Naam Aana Chaahiye v1" - Mohammed Rafi, Asha Bhosle, Amit Kumar
"Zindagi Ka Yoon Jubaan Par Naam Aana Chaahiye v2" - Mohammed Rafi, Asha Bhosle, Amit Kumar
MUSIC BY Laxmikant Pyarelal

External links
 

1979 films
1970s Hindi-language films
Films scored by Laxmikant–Pyarelal
Films set in airports